David Mycock (born 18 October 1969) is a former English  footballer who played as a defender.

References

1969 births
Living people
English footballers
Association football defenders
Rochdale A.F.C. players
English Football League players
People from Todmorden